Trinayani is an Indian Bengali-language television supernatural soap opera that premiered on 4 March 2019 and aired on Bengali GEC Zee Bangla. It is also digitally available on ZEE5. The show starred Gourab Roy Chowdhury and Shruti Das. The story of the girl who can foresee the future was well received by the audience.

Cast

Main
 Shruti Das as Trinayani Basu aka Nayan. 
 Gourab Roy Chowdhury as Driptobroto Basu aka Dipu.

Recurring
 Jasmine Roy as Jasmine / Jessi. 
 Debjani Chattopadhyay as Sanjukta Basu  Dripto's step-mother, Topobroto's second wife. 
 Sujoy Prasad Chatterjee / Sourav Chatterjee as Vicky Deb - Sanjukta's younger brother. 
 Siddhartha Banerjee as Dr.Devdut - Eye specialist and also Nayan's well-wisher.
 Yuvraj Chowdhury as Jasmine's husband.
 Moyna Mukherjee as Kalpana Basu - Dripto's late mother. 
 Kaushiki Guha as Trinayani's mother.
 Priya Malakar as Kumu: Trinayani's Sister. 
 Mita Chatterjee as Kripamoyee Basu- Dripto's grandmother, Topobroto's mother.
 Bodhisattwa Majumder as Topobroto Basu- Dripto's father, Kalpana and Sanjukta's husband.
 Pushpita Mukherjee as Protima Basu - Dripto's aunt, Topobroto's younger brother's wife, a drunkard.
 Aditya Chowdhury as Piku Basu - Dripto's half-brother, Sanjukta-Tapobroto's elder son, Rangana's husband. 
 Rii Sen as Rangana Basu, Piku's wife.
 Indranil Mallick as Jeet Basu - Dripto's younger half-brother, Sanjukta-Tapobroto's younger son.
 Debaparna Chakraborty as Sudha. 
 Rohit Mukherjee as Tarun Karmakar, Sudha's father and police inspector who loves Trinayani like a daughter.
 Neil Chatterjee as Jayanta- Jasmine's Elder Brother, Sudha's Husband. 
 Nandini Chatterjee as Durba- Topobroto's younger sister, Dripto's paternal aunt. 
 Ratna Ghoshal as Suhasini Lahiri. 
 Abhijit Guha as Aniruddha Lahiri - Suhasini's first son,Korok and Koli's father.
 Arindam Chatterjee as Aniket Lahiri - Suhasini's second son.
 Dwaipayan Das as Anil Lahiri  - Suhasini's younger son.
 Sanmitra Bhaumik as Korok Lahiri-Suhasini's Grandson, Aniruddha's son, Koli's brother.
 Deerghoi Paul as Koli Lahiri-Suhasini's Granddaughter, Aniruddha's daughter, Korok's sister.

Adaptations

References

External links 
 Trinayani at ZEE5
 

Zee Bangla original programming